Mud Springs, is a spring on Crane Ridge located just above the Arroyo Mocho in Alameda County, California.

References

Bodies of water of Alameda County, California
Diablo Range
La Vereda del Monte